Wills Creek may refer to:

Wills Creek (North Branch Potomac River), in Pennsylvania and Maryland
Wills Creek (Ohio), a tributary of the Muskingum River
Wills Creek, Ohio, an unincorporated community

See also
Little Wills Creek, a tributary of Wills Creek in Pennsylvania